Gerry Christie is a Scottish retired footballer. He was born in Port Glasgow on 13 December 1957.

Career

 Ayr United (1976–84) 221 apps 30 goals
 Airdrieonians (1984–88) 101 apps 14 goals
 Clydebank (loan) (1986–87) 3 apps 0 goals
 Perth Italia (1987–91)
 Stirling Lions (1991–93)
 Spearwood Dalmatinac (1994–95)
 Western Knights (1996–97)

References

https://web.archive.org/web/20080803145212/http://members.iinet.net.au/~jacob/wasoccer/halloffame/CenturyOfChampionsTheModernEra.htm

1957 births
Scottish footballers
Living people
People from Port Glasgow
Ayr United F.C. players
Airdrieonians F.C. (1878) players
Clydebank F.C. (1965) players
Scottish Football League players
Association football wingers
Western Knights SC players
Scottish expatriate sportspeople in Australia
Scottish expatriate footballers
Expatriate soccer players in Australia
Footballers from Inverclyde